The Payamino River is a river of Ecuador. It is a tributary of the Napo River, merging into the latter at the city of Puerto Francisco de Orellana.

See also
List of rivers of Ecuador

References

 Kichwa Community Development Project along the Payamino River www.payamino.org
 Rand McNally, The New International Atlas, 1993.
  GEOnet Names Server
 Water Resources Assessment of Ecuador

Rivers of Ecuador